The Transformers: Spotlight is a comic book series of one-shot issues, published by IDW Publishing.

The series consists of single-issue stories based in IDW's Generation 1 fictional universe, each featuring an individual character. Split in volumes of 5, the first volume featured Shockwave, Nightbeat, Hot Rod, Sixshot, and Ultra Magnus. The second featured Soundwave, Kup, Galvatron, Optimus Prime and Ramjet. The third featured Blaster, Arcee, Mirage and Grimlock and Wheelie, with four more issues comprising The Transformers: Revelation. Although the Shockwave and Nightbeat issues were numbered #1 and #2 respectively, individual numbering for the series was abandoned with the Hot Rod issue as the series expanded beyond five issues. In addition to being stand-alone, most of these issues tie into the main series, and offer additional context.

Issues

Continuity
Shockwave was a prequel to The Transformers: Infiltration (January–June 2006) and Stormbringer (July–October 2006). It explains the source of the energon used in both stories, the former being the one Starscream empowers himself with, and the latter being used by Bludgeon to resurrect Thunderwing. It also shows Bludgeon possessing Shockwave's laboratory which he later uses to find the Ultra Energon to re-power Thunderwing, as shown in Soundwave. Most of the Spotlights were all touched upon in Escalation (November 2006–April 2007): Scorponok was hinted to be working on the same process with the human organization the Machination, and Laserbeak and Ravage are shown as captives of Skywatch. Sixshot and the Reapers appear in Devastation (October 2007–February 2008), having been summoned by Megatron.

Nightbeat, Galvatron and Optimus Prime touched upon the Dead Universe storyline, which is to be a major focus of The Transformers: Revelation. Thunderwing is killed at the conclusion of Stormbringer, when his corpse is taken in Galvatron, and Optimus Prime is set after Escalation, where he had a vision after being beaten unconscious by Megatron. Ramjet was introduced in the New Avengers/Transformers crossover  with his Spotlight taking place concurrently with Escalation. Arcee takes place concurrently with issue 5 of The Transformers: Devastation, with Prime pulling the Autobots from Earth as a direct result of what happened in that issue. Arcee also acts as a sequel to Optimus Prime, picking up on many themes introduced in that story, such as the fate of the Monster Pretenders and the introduction of Jhiaxus. Grimlock follows up on both Grimlock being recovered by Skywatch and the Machination plotline in Devastation, as well as acting as a sequel of sorts to Shockwave.

The issues focusing on Cyclonus, Hardhead, Doubledealer and Sideswipe were four interrelated issues which comprise The Transformers: Revelation, which was a direct continuation story from The Transformers: Devastation.

Drift and Metroplex are prelude stories to All Hail Megatron.

References

External links
Official site

2006 comics debuts
2013 comics endings
Spotlight
IDW Publishing titles
One-shot comic titles